The 14th Genie Awards were held on December 12, 1993. In a bid to increase the visibility of the Genie Awards in the francophone market in Quebec, the ceremony was held in Montreal and conducted in French for the first time.

Hosted by Marc Labrèche, the ceremony was broadcast live on Radio-Canada, following which CBC Television aired a live special conducting English language interviews with the winners.

Nominees and winners
The Genie Award winner in each category is shown in bold text.

References

External links 
Genie Awards 1993 on imdb 

14
Genie
Genie
Genie Awards